Beating Heart (French: Battement de coeur) is a 1940 French comedy film directed by Henri Decoin and starring Danielle Darrieux, Claude Dauphin and André Luguet. It was shot at the Billancourt Studios in Paris. The film' sets were designed by the art directors Léon Barsacq and Jean Perrier. It was inspired by the 1939 Italian film Heartbeat. The film was remade in Hollywood as Heartbeat in 1946 starring Ginger Rogers and Basil Rathbone.

Synopsis 
It tells the story of a young woman escaping from reform school who tries to steal a foreign ambassador's watch but ends up falling in love with him.

Cast
 Danielle Darrieux as Arlette
 Claude Dauphin as 	Pierre de Rougemont
 André Luguet as 	Le comte d'Argay - l'ambassadeur
 Junie Astor as La comtesse Florence d'Argay - l'ambassadrice
 Charles Dechamps as Le baron Dvorak
 Sylvain Itkine as 	Le premier voleur
 Pierre Feuillère as 	Le second voleur
 Jean Hébey as 	Ponthus
 Julien Carette as 	Yves Calubert 
 Jean Tissier as 	Roland Médeville
 Saturnin Fabre as 	Monsieur Aristide
 Roland Armontel as 	Firmin 
 Marguerite de Morlaye as 	La dame au bal 
 Dora Doll as 	La secrétaire 
 Jean Joffre as 	Le maire 
 Marcelle Monthil as Madame Aristide 
 Geneviève Morel as Marinette - une élève 
 André Nicolle as 	L'inspecteur 
 Robert Ozanne as 	L'adjoint au maire 
 Sylvain as Le témoin de Roland

References

Bibliography
 Affron, Charles & Mirella Jona Affron. Best Years: Going to the Movies, 1945-1946. Rutgers University Press, 2009.

External links

Battement de coeur at filmsdefrance.com 
Battement de coeur at cinema-francais.fr

1940 films
French black-and-white films
1940s French-language films
French comedy-drama films
1940 comedy-drama films
1940s French films
Films set in Paris
Films directed by Henri Decoin
Films shot at Billancourt Studios